Romaña is a Spanish-language surname.  Notable people with the name include:

 Romaña (guerrilla leader), Henry Castellanos Garzón, a Colombian guerrilla leader
 Alberto Rey de Castro y Romaña (1869–1961), a Peruvian politician and diplomat
 Carlos Romaña (born 1999), a Colombian football player 
 Cecilio Romaña (1899–1997, an Argentinian physician
 Eduardo López de Romaña (1847–1912), president of Peru 1899–1903
 Enrique Romaña (born 1988), Colombian football player

See also

Romana (disambiguation)

Spanish-language surnames